Mama Diop (born 9 October 1994) is a Senegalese footballer who plays as a forward for French Division 2 Féminine club Marseille and the Senegal women's national team.

Club career
Diop has played for Lycée Ameth Fall in Senegal and for FCF Condéen, Orvault SF, Toulouse FC, Arras FCF and Lens in France.

International career
Diop capped for Senegal at senior level during the 2014 Africa Women Cup of Nations qualification.

References

External links

1994 births
Living people
People from Thiès Region
Senegalese women's footballers
Women's association football forwards
Toulouse FC (women) players
RC Lens players
Senegal women's international footballers
Senegalese expatriate footballers
Senegalese expatriate sportspeople in France
Expatriate women's footballers in France